Tephromela is a genus of lichens in the family Tephromelataceae. There are about 25 species in this widespread genus.

Species
Tephromela alectoronica 
Tephromela antarctica 
Tephromela arafurensis 
Tephromela atra 
Tephromela atrocaesia 
Tephromela atroviolacea 
Tephromela austrolitoralis 
Tephromela baudiniana  – Australia
Tephromela bourgeanica 
Tephromela buelliana 
Tephromela bullata 
Tephromela bunyana 
Tephromela connivens 
Tephromela disciformis 
Tephromela disjuncta 
Tephromela erosa 
Tephromela eviolacea 
Tephromela follmannii 
Tephromela gigantea 
Tephromela globularis 
Tephromela granularis 
Tephromela grumosa 
Tephromela immersa 
Tephromela isidiosa 
Tephromela korundensis 
Tephromela lignicola  – Falkland Islands
Tephromela lillipillensis 
Tephromela lirellina 
Tephromela lucifraga 
Tephromela lucifuga 
Tephromela matogrossensis 
Tephromela minor 
Tephromela neobunyana 
Tephromela nothofagi  – Australia
Tephromela olivetorica 
Tephromela pacifica 
Tephromela parasitica 
Tephromela pertusarioides 
Tephromela physodica 
Tephromela priestleyi 
Tephromela promontorii 
Tephromela rhizophorae 
Tephromela rimosula 
Tephromela skottsbergii 
Tephromela sorediata 
Tephromela stenosporonica 
Tephromela superba 
Tephromela territoriensis 
Tephromela variabilis

References

Lecanorales
Lecanorales genera
Lichen genera
Taxa described in 1929
Taxa named by Maurice Choisy